Sleeping Beauty is a Disney media franchise that began in 1959 with the theatrical release of Sleeping Beauty.

Feature films

Sleeping Beauty (1959) 

Sleeping Beauty is a 1959 American animated musical fantasy film produced by Walt Disney based on The Sleeping Beauty by Charles Perrault. It is the 16th Disney animated feature film. In 2019, Sleeping Beauty was selected for preservation in the National Film Registry by the Library of Congress for being "culturally, historically, or aesthetically significant".

Maleficent films

Maleficent (2014) 

Maleficent is a live-action spin-off film based in 1959's animated film, focused on the eponymous antagonist portrayed by Angelina Jolie.

Maleficent: Mistress of Evil (2019) 

Maleficent: Mistress of Evil is the sequel of the 2014 film Maleficent, continuing the story of the first film. The film was released on October 18, 2019.

Direct-to-video and television films

Keys to the Kingdom (2007) 

As a segment of Disney Princess Enchanted Tales: Follow Your Dreams, "Keys to the Kingdom" focuses on Princess Aurora, who reigns the kingdom in the absence of her parents, and Merryweather gives Aurora her wand in case she needs any assistance and warns her to be very careful with it.

Descendants (2015) 

Descendants is a live-action Disney Channel Original Movie based on the lives of the children of various Disney heroes and villains when they attend the same prep school. The film focused mainly on Mal, daughter of Maleficent, who is the main antagonist of the movie. The film also includes Audrey, Aurora and Phillip's daughter, and Queen Leah also makes a minor appearance.

Descendants 2 (2017) 

Decedents 2 is the sequel to the 2015 film Descendants. The film again focuses on Mal, however Maleficent herself does not feature. Aurora, Prince Phillip and their daughter Audrey are not present in the film.

Descendants 3 (2019) 

A third film in the Descendants franchise was released in mid 2019. It featured Mal and Audrey, the daughters of Maleficent and Aurora respectively.

Television series

Disney's House of Mouse (2001–2003) 

Disney's animated television series Disney's House of Mouse included many Disney animated character cameos such as the Sleeping Beauty characters. Characters from Sleeping Beauty also make minor appearances in the direct-to-video films based in the show, Mickey's Magical Christmas: Snowed in at the House of Mouse and Mickey's House of Villains.

Sofia the First (2012–2018) 

Flora, Fauna, and Merryweather appear as recurring characters in the American animated television series Sofia the First, as the headmistresses of Royal Prep.

Aurora appeared in the 24th episode of the series, "Holiday in Enchancia". The series features characters from the Disney Princess franchise.

Theme park attractions

Sleeping Beauty Castle 

Sleeping Beauty Castle is a fairy tale castle at the center of Disneyland and Disneyland Park (Paris) and formerly at Hong Kong Disneyland. It is based on the late-19th century Neuschwanstein Castle in Bavaria, Germany.

Le Château de la Belle au Bois Dormant 

Le Château de la Belle au Bois Dormant (English: The Castle of the Sleeping Beauty) is the fairy tale castle at the centre of Disneyland Paris and is a continuation of Sleeping Beauty Castle.

Video games

Kingdom Hearts series (2002–present) 
Maleficent is one of the main antagonists in the Kingdom Hearts video game series, appearing in most entries in the series. Aurora appears for first time in Kingdom Hearts as one of the Seven Princesses of Heart. Flora, Fauna and Merryweather, as well as Maleficent's raven, appear for the first time in Kingdom Hearts II. Kingdom Hearts Birth by Sleep include a world based on the animation film, Enchanted Dominion, which includes for the first time in the games to Prince Phillip and Maleficent's goons.

Disney Princess: Magical Jewels (2007) 
Aurora appears in Disney Princess: Magical Jewels as a playable character.

Disney Infinity (2014–2016) 
The 2014 live-action version of Maleficent is a playable character in the Disney Infinity video game series, beginning with Disney Infinity 2.0 (2015). As with the other playable characters in the game, a tie-in figure for Maleficent was also released.

Disney Magic Kingdoms (2016) 
Maleficent appears as a non-player character and the main antagonist in the video game Disney Magic Kingdoms, where she casts a curse on the titular Kingdom. Aurora, Prince Phillip, Flora, Fauna and Merryweather appear as playable characters in the main storyline of the game.

Cast and characters

References 

Walt Disney Studios (division) franchises